An ultra-prominent peak, or Ultra for short, is a mountain summit with a topographic prominence of  or more; it is also called a P1500.
The prominence of a peak is the minimum height of climb to the summit on any route from a higher peak, or from sea level if there is no higher peak. 
There are approximately 1,524 such peaks on Earth. Some well-known peaks, such as the Matterhorn and Eiger, are not Ultras because they are connected to higher mountains by high cols and therefore do not achieve enough topographic prominence. 

The term "Ultra" originated with earth scientist Steve Fry, from his studies of the prominence of peaks in Washington in the 1980s. His original term was "ultra major mountain", referring to peaks with at least  of prominence.

Distribution
Currently, 1,518 Ultras have been identified above sea level: 639 in Asia, 356 in North America, 209 in South America, 120 in Europe (including 12 in the Caucasus), 84 in Africa, 69 in Oceania, and 41 in Antarctica. 

Many of the world's largest mountains are Ultras, including Mount Everest, K2, Kanchenjunga, Kilimanjaro, Mont Blanc, and Mount Olympus. On the other hand, others such as the Eiger and the Matterhorn are not Ultras because they do not have sufficient prominence.  Many Ultras lie in rarely visited and inhospitable parts of the world, including 39 in Greenland, the high points of the Arctic islands of Novaya Zemlya, Jan Mayen and Spitsbergen, and many of the peaks of the Greater ranges of Asia. In British Columbia, some of the mountains listed do not even have generally recognized names.  

A number of Ultras have yet to be climbed, with Sauyr Zhotasy, (possibly) Mount Siple, and Gangkar Puensum being the most likely candidates for the most prominent unclimbed mountain in the world.  

All of the Seven Summits are Ultras by virtue of the fact that they are the high points of large landmasses. Each has its key col at or near sea level, resulting in a prominence value almost equal to its elevation.

Lists of Ultras (1518)

General
 List of islands by highest point gives the 75 highest island highpoints, all of which are Ultras
 List of mountain peaks by prominence gives the 125 most prominent peaks worldwide.

Africa (84) 
 List of Ultras of Africa (84)

Antarctica (41) 
 List of Ultras of Antarctica, including South Atlantic islands (41)

Asia (639) 
 List of Ultras of Central Asia (75)
 List of Ultras of Japan (21)
 List of ultras of Northeast Asia (53)
 List of Ultras of Southeast Asia (42)
 List of Ultras of the Himalayas, including Sino-Nepal Provinces (76)
 List of Ultras of the Karakoram and Hindu Kush (61)
 List of Ultras of the Malay Archipelago (92, including 12 in Oceania )
 List of Ultras of the Philippines (31)
 List of Ultras of Tibet, East Asia and neighbouring areas, including India (112)
 List of Ultras of West Asia (88)

Europe (120) 
 List of Alpine peaks by prominence (44)
 List of European ultra-prominent peaks (76), including non-Alpine European Ultras (60), the Atlantic islands (6), and the European Caucasus Mountains (10)
 List of the highest European ultra-prominent peaks (33)

North America (356)

 List of Ultras of North America (356)
 List of the most prominent summits of Canada (143, including 6 bordering the United States)
 List of the most prominent summits of the United States (129, including 6 in Oceania  and 6 bordering Canada)
 List of Ultras in Alaska (65, including 4 bordering Yukon and 2 bordering British Columbia)
 List of Ultras of Central America (23)
 List of Ultras of Greenland (39)
 List of Ultras of Mexico (27)
 List of Ultras of the Caribbean (7)

Oceania (69) 
 List of Ultras of Oceania, including the southern Indian Ocean (69)
 List of Ultras of Australia (2)
 List of Ultras of New Zealand (10)
 List of Ultras of Papua New Guinea (31)
 List of Ultras of the Hawaiian Islands (6)
 List of Ultras of the Pacific Islands (6)
 List of Ultras of the southern Indian Ocean (2)
 List of Ultras of Western New Guinea (Indonesia) (12)

South America (209)
 List of Ultras of South America (209)

See also 

 List of mountain lists
 List of mountain peaks by prominence
 Topographic prominence

References

Mountains
Topography
 Ultra